Georgi Moskov (born 27 August 1936) is a Bulgarian wrestler. He competed in the men's Greco-Roman flyweight at the 1960 Summer Olympics.

References

External links
 

1936 births
Living people
Bulgarian male sport wrestlers
Olympic wrestlers of Bulgaria
Wrestlers at the 1960 Summer Olympics
People from Haskovo
Sportspeople from Haskovo Province